Kazuhiro Kuroda (黒田 一博, September 13, 1924 – August 17, 2007) was a Japanese professional baseball centerfielder in Nippon Professional Baseball (NPB).

Career
Kuroda attended Sasebo Shogyo High School.

Kuroda was a center fielder for eight years in NPB. He debuted with the 1949 Nankai Hawks, hitting .324/.360/.408 in 51 games, mostly as a bench player. In 1950, Kuroda hit .257/.282/.405 in his first year as a regular, then he batted .259/.279/.382 the next season. In 1952, Kazuhiro had a .241/.263/.324 year and he finished his Nankai run at .246/.287/.322 in 1953. Kuroda was taken in the expansion draft by the new Takahashi Unions and hit .246/.290/.334 their first year. In 1955, he slipped to .237/.269/.307, then he finished his career by going just 7 for 62 for the 1956 Daiei Stars. Overall, his batting line read .246/.279/.340.

Retirement
After retiring, he opened a sports store and was active in Little League. He died of lung cancer at age 82.

Personal life
Kuroda's wife, Yasuko, competed in the 1964 Olympics in the shot put. His son, Hiroki, pitched in NPB and Major League Baseball.

References

External links

1924 births
2007 deaths
Baseball people from Nagasaki Prefecture
People from Sasebo
Japanese baseball players
Nippon Professional Baseball outfielders
Daiei Stars players
Takahashi Unions players
Nankai Hawks players